Andrei Mazunov (born 31 March 1967) is a male Russian former international table tennis player.

He won a bronze medal at the 1991 World Table Tennis Championships in the men's doubles with his brother Dmitry Mazunov.

See also
 List of table tennis players

References

Russian male table tennis players
Soviet table tennis players
Living people
1967 births
Table tennis players at the 1988 Summer Olympics
Table tennis players at the 1992 Summer Olympics
Table tennis players at the 1996 Summer Olympics
Olympic table tennis players of Russia
Olympic table tennis players of the Unified Team
Olympic table tennis players of the Soviet Union
World Table Tennis Championships medalists